Dioryctria monticolella is a species of snout moth in the genus Dioryctria. It was described by Akira Mutuura, Eugene G. Munroe and Douglas Alexander Ross in 1969, and it is known from southern British Columbia, Canada.

The wingspan is 12-12.5 mm. The forewings are black and white with some brownish scaling, though the wings appear faded.

The larvae feed on Pinus monticola. They bore under the bark in the cambial layer of their host plant. They prefer to attack wounds in the bark.

References

Moths described in 1969
monticolella